Fouad Hajji (born 8 December 1982) is a Belgian actor. Fouad is known for his role on the CBS crime drama television series NCIS: Los Angeles in which he played opposite Daniela Ruah and Eric Christian Olsen. One of his major screen roles is that of Amajagh opposite Gary Sinise in the CBS upcoming police procedural television series Criminal Minds: Beyond Borders. Hajji also appeared in a number of films with roles such as Jafaar Atayeb in The Mummy Resurrected produced by Ray Haboush, Ahmed in False Colors directed by William Norton, Rachid in the award winning film Ou Quoi directed by Cecilia Verheyden, which won Best Fiction Début at the International ShortFilm Festival Leuven, and Javed in the 2011 award-nominated film Odium directed by Neale Hemrajani. 
He is also known for performing stunts and dance at the TMF Awards (Belgium) as well as for international artists Hadise, Sandrine Van Handenhoven and RoxorLoops. He has appeared in music videos with Kamran & Hooman, Kate Ryan and Sami Yusuf.

Life and career

Fouad Hajji was born in Vilvoorde, Belgium,  to Moroccan immigrant parents. 
He is fluent in French, Arabic, Dutch and English.
In his early career Fouad taught breakdance and hip-hop at dance schools AS Dance, K-creation, Dasa and Jazzmijn. Fouad performed at the TMF Awards (Belgium) as well as with international artists Hadise, Sandrine Van Handenhoven and RoxorLoops.
Fouad obtained a bachelor's degree in information technology at Honim College and obtained a master's degree in international business at Vlekho College in Brussels. 
Fouad attended the Parallax school of Actors and The Flanders Acting Studio, where he intensively studied Method acting, Meisner technique and emotional preparation.
Fouad portrayed the role of ‘Rachid’ opposite Luk Wyns in the award winning film Ou Quoi directed by Cecilia Verheyden, which won Best Fiction Début at the International ShortFilm Festival Leuven and the role of ‘Javed’ in the award-nominated 2011 Odium, directed by Neale Hemrajani.
Late 2010, Fouad signs with a US talent agency and moves to Los Angeles. He went on to be cast in several feature films including "The Mummy Resurrected" produced by Ray Haboush as well as "False Colors" directed by William Norton.
In late 2013 he lands his first network TV role on the CBS crime drama television series NCIS: Los Angeles in which he played opposite Daniela Ruah and Eric Christian Olsen. In 2015 he adds another network show to his list by guest starring opposite Gary Sinise in the CBS upcoming police procedural television series Criminal Minds: Beyond Borders.

Partial filmography
 Ou quoi (2007, Short) .... Rachid
 Kidnap & Rescue (2011, TV Series) .... Tariq
 The Faithful (2011, Short) .... Alhasan
 Odium (2011, Short) .... Javed
 Triggers: Weapons That Changed the World (2011-2012, TV Series documentary) .... Rebel
 1000 Ways To Die (2012, TV Series documentary) .... Hadal
 Mike India Alpha (2013, Short) .... Kinah
 NCIS: Los Angeles (2013, TV Series) .... Shooter
 Deadly Wives (2014, TV Series) .... Danny Attar
 The Mummy Resurrected (2014) .... Jafaar Atayeb
 Waheed (2015, Short) .... Sultan
 False Colors (2016) .... Ahmed
 Criminal Minds: Beyond Borders (2016, TV Series) .... Amajagh
 Madam Secretary (2017, TV Series) .... Hassan Alsnany
 Animal Kingdom (2019, TV Series) .... Clifton
 Magnum P.I. (2021, TV Series) .... Dave/Lenny
 Rebel (2022)

References

External links
 
 
Cinetelerevue.be
Goeiedag.be
Cinetelerevue.be
Hln.be
Celebslists.com
Dreadcentral.com
Topfamouscelebrities.com
People.theiapolis.com
Watchfreemovies.ch
Dvd-copy.com
All-movies.eu

1982 births
Belgian male film actors
Belgian people of Moroccan descent
Belgian male television actors
Living people
People from Vilvoorde
21st-century Belgian male actors